A pinch point or pinch point hazard is a common class of mechanical hazard where injury or damage may be done by one or more objects moving towards each other, crushing or shearing whatever comes between them. A nip point is a type of pinch point involving rotating objects, such as gears and pulleys. Injuries can range from minor such as blisters to severe like amputations and fatalities.  Examples of pinch point hazards include gaps in closing doors and objects swinging or being lowered near fixed objects.

Common causes of injuries

Poor situational awareness
Proximity to mobile equipment and fixed structures
Loose clothing, hair or jewelry getting caught in rotating parts or equipment
Inadequate safety barriers
Handling errors
Wrong work procedures or tools
Reaching into moving equipment

Safety controls

Pre-work hazard inspections can be performed to identify pinch point hazards. These hazards can be managed with control methods, listed below according to the hazard control hierarchy.

Engineering controls physically prevent objects from entering the pinch point.

 Barriers and machine guards

Administrative controls inform worker behavior to avoid pinch points.
Area demarcation 
Lockout–tagout
Situational awareness
Use of appropriate training, work procedures, instructions, and operating manuals
Personal protective equipment protects individuals exposed to the hazard by preventing objects from being pinched.

See also

 
 Mechanical hazard- Hazard with a mechanical energy source

References

Technology hazards